Red Roses and Petrol is a 2003 drama film based on the stage play of the same name by Joseph O'Connor. The film was directed by Tamar Simon Hoffs, and stars Malcolm McDowell and Max Beesley. It was released, on DVD, in 2008.

Plot 
Amid a haze of cigarette smoke and uneaten food, the family of Enda Doyle (Malcolm McDowell) gathers in Dublin for his wake.  A university librarian, poet, and complicated man, he has left behind a trail of unresolved issues, a dysfunctional family, and a disturbing mystery.  Red Roses and Petrol, a darkly comic feature film by director Tamar Simon Hoffs, explores the emotional twists and turns of familial relationships.

Enda's dazed widow, Moya (Olivia Tracey), anxiously prepares for the next day's funeral with her still stuck-at-home, twenty-something daughter Medbh (Maeve) (Heather Juergensen), lending a loving hand.  Moya's desperation to keep her family together and Medbh's sharp tongue provide the backdrop for the arrival from New York of headstrong older sister Catherine (Susan Lynch), with her handsome but awkward boyfriend Tom (Greg Ellis) in tow.  They doubt that London-based Johnny (Max Beesley), the angry black sheep brother of the family, will appear at all.  Sorting through boxes of Enda's books, the women discover a cache of self-recorded video diaries that might shed light on who Enda Doyle really was, and some of the secrets of his life that he was never able to share with them.

At the funeral, the daughters see a distraught young woman from the university, Helen (Catherine Farrell), rumored to be having an affair with Enda.  They're stunned that she would show up so brazenly at a family gathering for the deceased Enda.  Returning home, they find Johnny emerging half-naked from the shower, after a quick tryst with a stewardess he met on his flight from London.  A brilliant, wounded slacker, Johnny manages to irritate everyone to the edge of violence with his biting and sarcastic recall of the family's long buried memories.  Johnny's confrontational behavior and bitter assessment of life with father, incite the clan into what can only be called unchecked family therapy.

Throughout the ensuing arguments, which reach a fevered pitch as the family gets inebriated waiting for guests to arrive for the wake, we learn about the powerful and ambiguous force that was Enda Doyle.  Finally, Catherine cannot contain herself and accuses Moya of being blind to her husband's infidelity and by extension causing great harm to herself and her children.  In a surprising twist, Enda's own videotapes give the family the answers they returned home to find.

Cast

Awards 
The film won first prize at the Avignon Film Festival, was runner up at the Westwood Film Festival, and received recognition at the Deauville Film Festival, AFI Fest, the Boston Irish Film Festival, the Newport Beach Film Festival, the Toronto International Film Festival circuit, and the Palm Springs Film Festival.

Soundtrack 
Songs for the film are by Flogging Molly and the director's daughter Susanna Hoffs, with original music by Seth Podowitz.

As listed in the movie credits (not necessarily on the soundtrack):
 Flogging Molly - "If I Ever Leave This World Alive"
 Susanna Hoffs - "The Water Is Wide" (Irish Mix)
 Flogging Molly - "Salty Dog"
 Flogging Molly - Drunken Lullabies"
 Flogging Molly - "Devils Dance Floor"
 Susanna Hoffs - "Catch The Wind", written by Donovan
 Flogging Molly - "The Worst Day Since Yesterday"
 Flogging Molly - "The Likes of You Again"

References

External links
 Red Roses and Petrol Official Site
 Red Roses and Petrol at the Internet Movie Database
 Red Roses and Petrol Interview 2008 at The213.net
 Olivia Tracey Interview at The Irish Examiner USA

2003 films
2003 drama films
American films based on plays
Films directed by Tamar Simon Hoffs
Films set in Ireland
Films about families
Films about writers
2000s English-language films